East Cornwall was a county constituency in the House of Commons of the Parliament of the United Kingdom. It elected two Members of Parliament (MPs) by the bloc vote system of election.

Boundaries 
In 1832 the county of Cornwall, in south west England, was split for parliamentary purposes into two county divisions. These were the East division (with a place of election at Bodmin) and West Cornwall (where voting took place at Truro). Each division returned two members to Parliament.

The parliamentary boroughs included in the East division, from 1832 to 1885 (whose non-resident 40 shilling freeholders voted in the county constituency), were Bodmin, Launceston and Liskeard.

1832–1885: The Hundreds of East, West, Lesnewth, Stratton, and Trigg, and in the hundred of Powder, the eastern division, i.e. the parishes of St Austell, St Blazey, St Dennis, St Ewe, Fowey, Gorran, Ladock, Lanlivery, Lostwithiel, Luxulyan, Mevagissey, St Mewan, St Michael Caerhays, Roche, St Sampson's, St Stephen-in-Brannel, and Tywardreath, and in the hundred of Pydar, the parishes of St Breock, Colan, St Columb Minor and St Columb Major, St Ervan, St Eval, St Issey, Lanhydrock, Lanivet, Mawgan, St Merryn, Padstow, Little Petherick, St Wenn, and Withiel.

History 
In 1885 this division was abolished, when the East and West Cornwall county divisions were replaced by six new single-member county constituencies. These were Bodmin (the South-Eastern division), Camborne (North-Western division), Launceston (North-Eastern division), St Austell (Mid division), St Ives (the Western division) and Truro. In addition the last remaining Cornish borough constituency was Penryn and Falmouth.

Members of Parliament

Election results

Elections in the 1830s

Elections in the 1840s

 

Eliot was appointed Chief Secretary to the Lord Lieutenant of Ireland, requiring a by-election.

Eliot was elevated to the peerage, becoming 3rd Earl of St Germans and causing a by-election.

Elections in the 1850s

Elections in the 1860s

Elections in the 1870s

Elections in the 1880s

 

Robartes was elevated to the peerage, becoming Lord Robartes.

 

There were 86 spoiled papers, which was considered an unusually high number.

See also

 List of former United Kingdom Parliament constituencies

References

 Boundaries of Parliamentary Constituencies 1885-1972, compiled and edited by F.W.S. Craig (Parliamentary Reference Publications 1972)
 British Parliamentary Election Results 1832-1885, compiled and edited by F.W.S. Craig (Macmillan Press 1977)
 The Parliaments of England by Henry Stooks Smith (1st edition published in three volumes 1844–50), second edition edited (in one volume) by F.W.S. Craig (Political Reference Publications 1973)
 Who's Who of British Members of Parliament: Volume I 1832-1885, edited by M. Stenton (The Harvester Press 1976)
 Who's Who of British Members of Parliament, Volume II 1886-1918, edited by M. Stenton and S. Lees (Harvester Press 1978)
 

19th century in Cornwall
Parliamentary constituencies in Cornwall (historic)
Constituencies of the Parliament of the United Kingdom established in 1832
Constituencies of the Parliament of the United Kingdom disestablished in 1885